Udmurt Dunne (The Udmurt World) is the main Udmurt language newspaper.

It is printed four times a week, and is the successor of the Soviet-era Sovetskoi Udmurtia, which received the Order of the Badge of Honour in 1968.

Newspapers published in Russia
Newspapers published in the Soviet Union
Izhevsk
Udmurt-language mass media